Gaza Ghetto: Portrait of a Family, 1948 – 1984 is  a documentary film  about the life of a Palestinian family living in the Jabalia refugee camp.

The film, created by Joan Mandell, Pea Holmquist, and Pierre Bjorklund in 1984 is believed to be the first documentary ever made in Gaza. The film features Ariel Sharon, Binyamin Ben-Eliezer and soldiers on patrol "candidly discuss[ing] their responsibilities."

In his book, An Accented Cinema: Exilic and Diasporic Filmmaking, Hamid Naficy describes the film as an "early important film" on the Palestinian refugee situation.

The film follows a refugee family from the Gaza Strip who visit  the site of their former village, now a Jewish town in Israel. As the grandfather and great-grandfather point out an orchard and sycamore fig that belonged to Muhammed Ayyub and Uncle Khalil, an Israeli resident appears and tells them to leave, claiming they need a permit to be there. The mother tells him that, "We work in Jaffa and Tel Aviv and that's not forbidden," to which he replies, "Here it's forbidden." Ted Swedenburg mentions his scene in Memories of Revolt: The 1936-1939 Rebellion and the Palestinian National Past: "While chasing the refugee family off, he asserts forcibly that the site is his home."

References

External links

Films set in the Gaza Strip
1984 films
Palestinian documentary films
Documentary films about refugees
Documentary films about the Israeli–Palestinian conflict
1984 documentary films
Documentary films about families
1984 in the Israeli Civil Administration area
Films shot in the State of Palestine